The Kansas Department for Children and Families (formerly the Kansas Department of Social and Rehabilitation Services) is a state agency in Kansas, responsible for the delivery of social services to those in need of them.

The agency was founded in 1973, and it is currently headed by Laura Howard.

History

Pre-establishment
The 1859 Wyandotte Constitution mandated that the state create and support institutions for “the benefit of the insane, blind, deaf and dumb, and such other benevolent institutions as the public good may require.” As a result, the Kansas Insane Asylum was established in 1866 in Osawatomie. Due to overcrowding, an additional asylum was approved by Governor Osborn; the Topeka State Hospital opened in 1879. Another asylum was opened in 1881, the State Asylum for Idiotic and Imbecile Youth in Lawrence which was moved to Winfield in 1887. It was renamed the State Home for the Feeble-Minded in 1909 and then renamed again to the State Training School in 1920. In 1903 the legislation to create the State Hospital for Epileptics in Parsons passed with the hospital being renamed the Parsons State Training School in 1953. The Larned State Hospital opened in 1914 which took on additional responsibilities with the opening of the State Security Hospital in 1939. In 1960 the Kansas Neurological Institute opened in Topeka and tuberculosis hospitals where opened in Norton in 1914 and Chanute in 1963. And lastly, the Rainbow Mental Health Facility was established in Osawatomie in 1973.

Prior to Executive Reorganization Order No. 1, all of these hospitals, as well as all social service programs where overseen by counties with very little government oversight. The only exception being state social security which, due to the 1937 Kansas Welfare Act had a state board oversee how to most efficiently spread federal funding. By 1949 this board became the state board for social welfare, however counties retained primary administrative control over welfare.

Establishment
The agency was first established in 1973 from then-Governor Docking's Executive Reorganization Order No. 1, which created the Kansas Department of Social and Rehabilitation Services. Governor Docking then appointed Dr. Robert Harder as the first secretary of the agency. In that same year, legislation was passed to transfer all social welfare programs from the various counties to the new agency. The time it took to transfer the programs to the new umbrella agency was about nine months.

Services
Child support services
Economic and employment services
Foster care
Prevention and protection services
Rehabilitation services

List of Secretaries

References

External links
Department of Children and Families website
Department for Children and Families publications at State Library of Kansas' KGI Online Library
former Department of Social and Rehabilitation Services publications at State Library of Kansas' KGI Online Library

Aging and Disability Services
Government agencies established in 1973
1973 establishments in Kansas